Rupela sejuncta is a moth in the family Crambidae. It was described by Carl Heinrich in 1937. It is found in North America, where it has been recorded from Alabama, Florida, Oklahoma and Texas.

The wingspan is 28–33 mm for males and 25–30 mm for females. The wings are shining white. Adults have been recorded on wing from March to July and from September to November.

References

Moths described in 1937
Schoenobiinae
Taxa named by Carl Heinrich